Tetlin may refer to:
 Tetlin, Alaska
 Tetlin Lake
 Tetlin River
 Tetlin National Wildlife Refuge